The 1969 Major League Baseball postseason was the playoff tournament of Major League Baseball for the 1969 season. It was the first edition of the new playoff system introduced by the MLB, coinciding with the beginning of the "Divisional Era." Each league expanded from 10 teams to 12 teams, and were divided into two six-team divisions. The 162-game schedule stayed in place, but now each team played the other five teams in their own division 18 times each (90 games) and the six teams in their league's other division 12 times each (72 games). The winners of each division would advance to the postseason and face each other in a League Championship Series to determine the pennant winners that would face each other in the World Series.

In the inaugural edition of the MLB postseason, the American League teams included the Baltimore Orioles, who were making their second postseason appearance in the past four years, and the Minnesota Twins, who were making their first postseason appearance since the 1965 World Series. This was the first of two consecutive postseason appearances for both the Orioles and Twins. On the National League side, the New York Mets ended a streak of many losing seasons and made their first postseason appearance in franchise history, becoming the first expansion team to accomplish such a feat. The Atlanta Braves also made their first postseason appearance in Georgia, and first appearance overall since the 1958 World Series.

The postseason began on October 4, 1969, two days after the end of the 1969 Major League Baseball season, and concluded on October 16, 1969, with the Mets upsetting the 109-win Orioles in five games in the 1969 World Series, to win their first ever World Series title.

Playoff seeds
The American and National leagues were split into two divisions per league. With the exception of 1981, until the addition of the wild card in 1995 only the two division winners in each league could qualify for the postseason.

The following teams qualified for the postseason:

American League
 Baltimore Orioles – AL East champions, AL regular season champions, best record in baseball, 109–53
 Minnesota Twins – AL West champions, 97–65

National League
 New York Mets – NL East champions, NL regular season champions, 100–62
 Atlanta Braves – NL West champions, 93–69

Playoff bracket

American League Championship Series

Minnesota Twins vs. Baltimore Orioles

This was the first of two consecutive postseason meetings between the Twins and Orioles. The Orioles swept the Twins to advance to the World Series for the second time in four years. 

The Orioles took Game 1 after twelve innings thanks to a sacrifice bunt from Paul Blair which drove in Mark Belanger. The Orioles also took Game 2 in extra innings, and set a postseason record for the longest complete game shutout, as Orioles' starting pitcher Dave McNally pitched eleven shutout innings. In Minneapolis for Game 3, Jim Palmer pitched a complete game as the Orioles blew out the Twins to secure the pennant. 

This was the first of three consecutive AL pennants won by the Orioles. The next year, the Orioles swept the Twins again to capture the pennant, and in 1971 the Orioles swept the Oakland Athletics. The Twins would not win the pennant until 1987.

National League Championship Series

New York Mets vs. Atlanta Braves

This was the first postseason meeting between the Mets and Braves, and the first postseason series ever played in the Deep South. The Mets swept the Braves to advance to their first World Series in franchise history. 

In Atlanta for Game 1, the Braves held a 5-4 lead after seven innings. However, the Mets rallied with five unanswered runs in the top of the eighth to steal the first ever NLCS game on the road. Game 2 was an offensive duel - the Mets jumped out to an 8-0 lead, and while the Braves cut their lead to as low as three, the Mets still held on to win by an 11-6 score. When the series shifted to Queens, Nolan Ryan helped lead the Mets' to the pennant in Game 3 with a solid seven-inning performance, winning his first postseason game. 

This was the last postseason appearance for the Braves until 1982. They would not win the NL pennant until 1991, which was also the year when the Braves' 14 year postseason streak began. The Mets would win the NL pennant the next two times they appeared in the postseason - in 1973 and 1986.

Both teams would meet again three decades later in the 1999 NLCS, which the Braves would win in six games.

1969 World Series

Baltimore Orioles (AL) vs. New York Mets (NL) 

Considered by many to be the biggest upset in World Series history, the Mets shocked the 109-win Orioles in five games to win their first championship in franchise history, becoming the first expansion team to win a World Series. 

While the Orioles took Game 1, the Mets narrowly won Game 2 in Baltimore to gain the home-field advantage. When the series moved to Queens for Game 3, the Mets shutout the Orioles, capped off by Nolan Ryan pitching the final  innings, earning Ryan a save in his only World Series appearance. The Orioles attempted to come back in Game 4 by sending the game into extra innings, but it wasn't enough as the Mets prevailed in the bottom of the 10th. The Orioles, in an attempt to send the series back to Baltimore, jumped out to an early 3-0 lead, however the Mets scored five unanswered runs in the sixth, seventh and eighth innings to take the lead for good and secure the title.

Along with the New York Jets winning Super Bowl III in January 1969 against Baltimore's football team in the Colts, the New York metropolitan area had both World Series and Super Bowl champions in the same season or calendar year.

The Orioles would redeem themselves in the World Series the following year, defeating the Cincinnati Reds in five games. The Mets would return to the World Series in 1973 as even greater underdogs than in 1969, but they would fall to the Oakland Athletics in seven games. Their next title would come in 1986, against the Boston Red Sox.

References

External links
 League Baseball Standings & Expanded Standings - 1969

 
Major League Baseball postseason